Bramdean School, Exeter was a private school situated in Heavitree, Exeter, founded in 1901 and closed in 2020.

Bramdean School was a non-selective mixed independent school of up to 200 pupils located in Heavitree, Exeter, Devon. Sporting coaches include Javier Martin Cortes, former La Liga Barcelona FC Academy coach, Keith Brown, former vice-captain MCCC Lords and Jill Stone, former junior Wimbledon player, and development coach of the Lawn Tennis Association. The school motto "Tenax et Fortis" translates as "steadfast and courageous".

Notable former pupils

Former alumni include Kristian Digby.

References

External links
 School website

Educational institutions established in 1901
Schools in Exeter
Defunct schools in Devon
1901 establishments in England
Educational institutions disestablished in 2020
2020 disestablishments in England